Wyrd is a Finnish Pagan black metal band which was formed in 1998. The band was originally formed under the name Hellkult in 1997 by Narqath and drummer Kalma (ex- Azaghal). The first Wyrd demo was released in early 2000, "Unchained Heathen Wrath" featured material recorded between 1998 and 2000. The lyrical themes are centered on old folklore and Nordic mythology. The name "Wyrd" is from Old English, meaning fate.

Current members
Narqath (Tomi Kalliola) - vocals, all non-percussion instruments (Azaghal), ex-Calm (Fin), ex-Decay's Delight, Finnugor, ex-Hin Onde, ex-Necromortum, ex-Oath of Cirion, ex-Svartalfheim (Fin), Svartkraft, ex-Thoronath, ex-Valar, Vultyr, Weltraum, With Hate I Burn, Hellkult)
JL Nokturnal - drums, percussion (ex-Hin Onde, Medieval Art, Nocturnal Winds, Yearning, Svartkraft, Azaghal)

Discography

Studio albums
2001: Heathen
2002: Huldrafolk
2003: Vargtimmen Pt. 1: The Inmost Night
2004: Vargtimmen Pt. 2: Ominous Insomnia
2005: Rota
2006: The Ghost Album
2007: Kammen
2009: Kalivägi
2016: Death Of The Sun

Demos, EPs and splits
2000: Unchained Heathen Wrath (Demo)
2000: Songs of the Northern Gale (Demo)
2001: Of Revenge and Bloodstained Swords (Demo)
2006: Tuonela (EP)
2007: Wyrd / Häive / Kehrä (Split)

Compilations
2003: Wrath & Revenge

References

External links
 Official website
 [ Biography] at Allmusic
 Biography at Rockdetector
 Wyrd - Avantgarde Music
 Kreation Records
 The official WYRD myspace
 The Official site of Naga Productions (released Kalivagi album)

Finnish black metal musical groups
Musical groups established in 1998